Paolo Martinelli may refer to: 
Paolo Martinelli (engineer) (born 1952), Italian automotive engineer
Paolo Martinelli (bishop) (born 1958), Italian Catholic bishop
Paolo Martinelli (rower), Italian lightweight rower